De La Salle Lipa, also known by its acronym DLSL, is a private Catholic Lasallian basic and higher educational institution run by the De La Salle Brothers of the Philippine District Of the Christian Brothers in Lipa City, Batangas, Philippines and was founded in 1962. It is one of the third generation of La Salle schools founded by the Catholic religious congregation De La Salle Brothers in the Philippines: La Salle Academy-Iligan (Iligan City, Lanao del Norte) in 1958, La Salle Green Hills (Mandaluyong) in 1959, Saint Joseph School-La Salle (Villamonte, Bacolod) in 1960 and De La Salle Lipa in 1962.

History
In school year 1985–1986, the College Department was formally opened, with Elsie Rabago as officer-in-charge. Norma Blanco was appointed the school's first lay high school principal in 1989. Because of the burgeoning school population, Br. Narciso Erquiza FSC was appointed as resident president.

On May 15, 1995, Brother Rafael Donato FSC, former president of De La Salle University, assumed the presidency of De La Salle Lipa. Under Brother Donato, the school constructed the SENTRUM, the Sen. Jose W. Diokno Building, the Chez Avenir Hotel (now called Chez Rafael), the St. La Salle Building, the Noli Me Tangere and El Filibusterismo structure clusters of the Jose Rizal Building, and the Centennial Sports Plaza.

In 1996, the school opened a graduate school, initially offering a Master in Management Technology degree. In 1997, the school became the first educational institution in Batangas to go online, with its web site launched in the same year.

A year later, De La Salle Lipa became one of the first schools around the world to launch an alumni registry web site. Called Umpokan, the web site has become fully interactive and is an online meeting place for graduates of the school.

In 2002, Juan Lozano was appointed the school's first vice-president and chief operating officer. In 2003, Donato retired from active service and was named president emeritus at the auditorium of the Sen. Jose Diokno building. Brother Manuel Pajarillo, FSC was then appointed president.

The school changed its organizational structure in 2005. With Br. Pajarillo still the school's president, Lozano was elevated to the position of Executive Vice-President. Rex Torrecampo was, meanwhile, appointed as the first Vice-President for Administration. The following year, Corazon Abansi became the school's first Vice-President for Academics and Research.

In 2006, the school's incorporation papers were amended to officially make it part of an umbrella entity, De La Salle Philippines, which was formed to synchronize the operations of the De La Salle schools with the mission of the De La Salle Brothers in the Philippines.

In May 2007, in keeping with the standards set by De La Salle Philippines, the executive vice-president became known as the chancellor, while the two vice-presidents became known as vice-chancellors. In school year 2006–2007, Pajarillo was president of three De La Salle schools (Lipa, Dasmariñas, and the Medical and Health Sciences Institute also in Dasmarinas, Cavite), in 2007 he was made president solely of De La Salle Lipa.

During his term, information technology and new facilities were established. Wireless internet connectivity was likewise introduced. The Book Mobile Reading Program (BMRP), a bus turned into a mobile library, was also launched. BMRP reached out to several communities to cater to the youth through storytelling sessions and other literacy training programs.

Campus
The De La Salle Lipa campus sits on a 10-hectare lot next to the J.P. Laurel National Highway, (Japan-Philippine Friendship highway), just on the outskirts of Lipa City. It is a 5-minute drive from the Southern Tagalog Arterial Road (STAR), which links the city to the Southern Luzon Express Way (SLEX). Batangas City, the provincial capital, is 5  minutes away via STAR tollway.

Entering the main access gate at the front of campus, visitors drive into well-paved concrete roads with parking facilities that can accommodate more than 200 vehicles. The SENTRUM is the first major structure seen, a multi-purpose building that has been the venue of pop concerts, professional basketball games, corporate assemblies, and religious gatherings.

In front of the SENTRUM is a well-kept garden that has a stone sculpture of the founder of the De La Salle Brothers St. Jean-Baptiste de La Salle.

Nearby are the Chez Rafael (formerly Chez Avenir and renamed in honor of the school's former president Br. Rafael S. Donato FSC), a laboratory hotel for BS Hotel & Restaurant Management majors, and the Sen. Jose Diokno Building, which holds the college's Learning Resource Center and the offices of executive administration. The Student Center near the Apolinario Mabini Buildings and CBEAM (College of Business, Economics, Accountancy and Management) Building, holds the building for the Student Government (SG) and the Council of Student Organization (CSO) for college.

The campus may be divided in two areas: the Integrated School side and the College side. Students are not prohibited from crossing to either side .

On the Integrated School side, the most recognizable structure is the St. La Salle Building, which is made up of several clusters just in front of the highway. The main cluster that offers the main access gate for Integrated School (IS) students is called the Hall of Lasallian Saints. The hall leads to the building's classrooms as well as the historic Br. Henry Virgil Memorial Gymnasium. The other main structures for IS students are the St. Benilde, St. Mutien Marie, and Br. Gregory Refuerzo Buildings. The Learning Resource Center is located inside the Br. Vernon Mabile Building. On the Senior High School side, the buildings that are used are the Claro M. Recto, and Jose Rizal (composed of the Noli Me Tangere and El Filibusterismo structure clusters).

College students hold classes on the western half of the campus, using the Apolinario Mabini Building, and CBEAM (College of Business, Economics, Accountancy and Management) Building. The Gregorio Zara building is also on the college side of the campus. Also known as the I.T. Domain Building, it holds the school's Network Operations Center as well as three computer laboratories. Beside the building is a gate and an access road that leads to the De La Salle Brothers’ Novitiate.

Academic programs

College Degree Programs
 College of Business, Economics, Accountancy and Management
 BS Accountancy
 BS Accounting Information System
 BS Accounting Technology
 BS Business Administration major in Business Economics
 BS Business Administration major in Financial Management
 BS Business Administration major in Marketing Management
 BS Entrepreneurship
 BS Legal Management
 BS Management Technology
 Certificate in Entrepreneurship
 College of Education, Arts and Sciences
 AB Communication
 AB Multimedia Arts
 BS Biology
 BS CBT
 Bachelor of Elementary Education
 Bachelor of Elementary Education major in Special Education
 BS Mathematics
 BS Psychology
 Bachelor of Secondary Education major in English
 Bachelor of Secondary Education major in Filipino
 Bachelor of Secondary Education major in Mathematics
 Bachelor of Secondary Education major in Social Studies
 College of International Hospitality and Tourism Management
 BS Hotel and Restaurant Management
 BS Tourism
 Certificate in Hotel and Restaurant Management
 Certificate in Culinary Arts
 College of Information Technology and Engineering
 BS Architecture
 BS Computer Engineering
 BS Computer Science
 BS Electronics and Communications Engineering
 BS Electrical Engineering
 BS Entertainment and Multimedia Computing (EMC) Specialization in Digital Animation
 BS Entertainment and Multimedia Computing (EMC) Specialization in Game Development
 BS Industrial Engineering
 BS Information Systems
 BS Information Technology
 Certificate in Information Technology
 College of Law
 Juris Doctor
 College of Nursing
 BS Nursing

Graduate Degree Programs
 Master in Management Technology
 Short Intensive Management Seminars
College Of Law

Organizational divisions

Academic division
Integrated School
 Primary Learning Community
 Junior Learning Community
 Senior Learning Community
College
 College of Business, Economics, Accountancy & Management (CBEAM)
 College of Education, Arts & Sciences (CEAS)
 College of International Hospitality and Tourism Management (CIHTM)
 College of Information Technology & Engineering (CITE)
 College of Law (COL)
 College of Nursing (CON)

Offices Under the OP and the OEVP

Office of the President
 Presidential Management Office

Office of the Executive Vice-President
 Lasallian Ministries
 Sports & Culture

Publications

Institutional
 The President's Report (Annual)
 The Ala (Salle) Eh! (Quarterly)
 SADYÂ (Twice Monthly)

Integrated school
 Bulik (Integrated School Broadsheet)
 Bulik Literary Folio (Student Magazine)
 Bakas (Grade School Student Newsletter)
 Kamalig (Student Newsletter)
 CRESCIT (Senior High School Newspaper)
 PÁNANAW (Senior High School Literary Folio)
 typo. (Senior High School Student Magazine)

College
 LAVOXA (Student Broadsheet & Tabloid)
 Umalohokan (Student Newsletter)
 L Magazine (Student Magazine)
 Utak Berde (Student Literary Magazine)
 Talas (Faculty Journal)
 MMT Link (Graduate School Journal)
 Etudes (Research Office Newsletter)
 Infobits (Guidance Newsletter)
 Parents’ Bulletin (Guidance Newsletter)
 Educator's Link (Guidance Newsletter)

References

 De La Salle Lipa: Academic Programs
 De La Salle Lipa: History

De La Salle Philippines
Universities and colleges in Batangas
Education in Lipa, Batangas
High schools in Batangas
Batangas
Nursing schools in the Philippines